Renu Bisht is an Indian politician and MLA from Yamkeshwar Assembly. She is  member of the Bharatiya Janata Party.

Electoral history

References

Living people
Bharatiya Janata Party politicians from Uttarakhand
Uttarakhand MLAs 2022–2027
People from Pauri Garhwal district
Year of birth missing (living people)